The 2010 NSW Premier League season was the 10th season of the revamped NSW Premier League. This season also marked the addition of a new team, in the Rockdale City Suns Football Club from the Super League (one division lower).

The 2010 season began on 27 February with the first two games being played.

Throughout the season, the Waratah Cup was once again contested, with competing teams from the Premier League, Super League, Division One and Division Two.

Clubs
Teams promoted from Super League:
(After the end of the 2009 season.)
Rockdale City Suns

Teams relegated to Super League:
(After the end of the 2009 season.)
Penrith Nepean United (now defunct)

Managerial changes

Regular season

League table

Results

Round 1

Round 2

Round 3

Round 4

Round 5

Round 6

Round 7

Round 8

Round 9

Round 10

Round 11

Round 12

Round 13

Round 14

Round 15

Round 16

Round 17

Round 18

Round 19

Round 20

Round 21

Round 22

Finals Series
Note: Minor Premiers get first week off

Week 1
Elimination Final

Loser is eliminated, winner goes on to face loser of Qualifying Final in week 2

Qualifying Final

Loser faces winner of Elimination Final in week 2, winner faces Minor Premiers in Semi Final 2 in week 2

Week 2
Semi Final 1

Winner goes to Grand Final loser faces winner of Semi Final 2 in Grand Final Qualifier in week 3

Semi Final 2

Loser is eliminated, winner goes on to play loser of Semi Final 2 in Grand Final Qualifier in week 3

Week 3
Preliminary Final

Loser is eliminated, winner goes through to Grand Final

Week 4
Grand Final

Top goalscorers

Statistics

Attendances
These are the attendance records of each of the teams at the end of the home and away season. The table does not include finals series attendances.

See also
NSW Premier League
Football NSW

References

External links
NSW Premier League Official Website
2010 Draw and Results

2010 in Australian soccer
2010 domestic association football leagues
2010